Friedrich Conrad August Fick (May 5, 1833, in Petershagen, Germany – March 24, 1916, in Hildesheim or Breslau) was a German philologist.

He spent his life chiefly at Göttingen, where he first studied philology under Theodor Benfey; became a teacher in the Gymnasium, and eventually in 1876 professor of comparative philology at the university; in 1887 accepted a professorship in Breslau, but retired four years later; author of a variety of learned works on philology.

Works 
"Wörterbuch der indogermanischen Grundsprache, 1868 – His "dictionary of Indo-European parent language" is considered to be the first work of its kind.
"Die ehemalige Spracheinheit der Indogermanen Europas : Eine sprachgeschichtliche Untersuchung", 1873 – The former speech unit of the Indo-European: A linguistic historical investigation.
"Die griechischen Personennamen : nach ihrer Bildung erklärt und systematisch geordnet", 1874 – Greek personal names; according to formation and systematic order.
"Vergleichendes Wörterbuch der indogermanischen Sprachen" Göttingen : Vandenhoeck & Ruprecht, 1890-1909 (4th edition). OCLC: 63812989. – Comparative dictionary of the Indo-European languages.
"Vorgriechische Ortsnamen als Quelle für die Vorgeschichte Griechenlands verwertet", 1905 – Former Greek place names as a source for the history of Greece.

Notes

1833 births
1916 deaths
People from Petershagen
German philologists
University of Göttingen alumni
Academic staff of the University of Göttingen
Academic staff of the University of Breslau